Kanchhi is a 1984 Nepali film directed by B.S. Thapa and produced by Bhagawan Das Shrestha. The film was a major hit in Nepal.

Cast and crew
The main roles were played by Sharmila Shah (now Sharmila Malla), Shiv Shrestha, Sushma Shahi, Shanti Maskey, Sushila Raimajhi and Sagar Thapa (The postman).

Soundtrack

The music of the film was composed by Gopal Yonzon.

Production
B.S. Thapa was the director, story writer and dialogue writer of the film. The film shooting took place in Pokhara, Nepal and in India.

References

External links
 Watch film
 Kanchhi songs

Nepalese romantic drama films
Nepali-language films
1984 films
Films shot in Pokhara